Lydia Molander (1851–1929) was a Finnish-Swedish stage actress and opera singer.

Lydia Molander was trained at the Royal Swedish Opera.  She was engaged at the Swedish Theatre in Helsinki in 1874-1894.  She was described as a very versatile stage artist, capable both within opera and operetta as well as a dramatic actor within drama and comedy.

References 

1851 births
1929 deaths
19th-century Finnish actresses
19th-century Finnish singers
Swedish expatriates in Finland